Abu Hena Mohammad Mustafa Kamal (Bengali: আবু হেনা মুহাম্মদ মুস্তফা কামাল; born 15 June 1947) commonly known as Lotus Kamal is a Bangladeshi politician and businessman. He is a member of the Jatiya Sangsad representing the Comilla-10 constituency and is a former Minister for Planning and current Minister of Finance. He is the owner of Lotus Kamal Group, which is a well-known Bengali textile industry. Kamal was awarded the Finance Minister of the Year 2020 by the Banker.

Early life 
Kamal was born on 15 June 1947 in Laksham, Cumilla, East Bengal, British India. After the primary education from local Dattapur Primary School, SSC from Bagmara High School in 1962, later HSC from Cumilla Victoria Government College, and B.Com. (Honors) degree from Chittagong Government Commerce College in 1964–1967. In 1967 he finished his undergraduate in Financial Management from the University of Dhaka. He completed his master's degree in accounting in 1968 from the University of Dhaka. He also earned a law degree. He is also an FCA (Fellow Chartered Accountant).

Business 
Kamal founded the Lotus Kamal Group which is a well-known Bengali textile industry.

Career

Politics
Kamal was elected to Parliament from Cumilla-9 in 1996. He was elected to his second term as a member of the Jatiya Sangsad for the constituency of Cumilla-10 in 2008 and 2014. He is Convener of Bangladesh Awami League in the Cumilla district (South). He is also the Finance and Planning Secretary of Bangladesh Awami League. He was appointed the Minister for Planning in January 2014.

Cricket administration
Kamal has been involved with cricket and its development for last 30 years in various capacities. From 1990 to 2010 he was chairman of the cricket committee of Abahani Limited, before becoming the President of Asian Cricket Council between 2010 and 2012.

In 2012, Kamal was named as the vice-president of the International Cricket Council (ICC) for the 2012–2014 term. Prior to his nomination for the ICC, Kamal was the president of the Bangladesh Cricket Board. Kamal succeeded Alan Isaac as president of the ICC in 2014.

Kamal resigned from his designation as ICC President, with effect from 1 April 2015. The resignation was reportedly to protest alleged non-compliance by the ICC of laws written in the constitution of the ICC, and he was an active protester of corruption in cricket.

Personal life
Kamal's daughter Nafisa Kamal is the director of Farmers Bank presently known as Padma Bank Limited and owner of Cumilla Victorians and wife is Kasmiri Kamal.

References 

1947 births
Living people
People from Comilla
Comilla Victoria Government College alumni
Awami League politicians
Bangladeshi cricket administrators
Presidents of the International Cricket Council
Planning ministers of Bangladesh
Finance ministers of Bangladesh
9th Jatiya Sangsad members
10th Jatiya Sangsad members
11th Jatiya Sangsad members